John Mabbe was the name of three English goldsmiths working in Tudor London.

The senior John Mabbe (died 1582) married Isabell Colley, and was Chamberlain of London. His son John married Martha Denham, and they were the parents of the third John Mabbe, the stationer Ralph Mabbe, and James Mabbe, a translator of Spanish literature.

John Mabbe senior appears to be the goldsmith who worked for Princess Mary recorded as "Mabell" by her lady in waiting Mary Finch. He had an interest in the Tabard, Inn, Southwark, and wrote a will in 1578. His son Robert Mabbe pledged a share of the inn to the goldsmith Affabel Partridge.

An inventory of John Mabbe the younger's stock in 1576 survives. After making a statute on the quality of gold sold in London, Elizabeth I allowed him to market his existing stock of jewellery made with gold under 22 ct fineness. It included jewels with the story of Joshua and Caleb, Charity, Hercules, Narcissus, Julis Caesar, a mermaid, the story of Mars, Venus and Cupid, Phoebus Apollo and Daphne, and the emblem Fama Perennis. A gold tablet or locket with a "Roman burning his hand in fire" told the story of Gaius Mucius Scaevola. There was a gold tortoise with a shell set with 39 topazes and a pendant emerald. He had 224 gold perfumed beads known as pomander beads from the name of the scented compound.

Kim F. Hall notes the representation of Black Africans depicted on gold brooches in Mabbe's 1576 inventory, with cameos of a "Mores-head", a "Blackamoore", and a woman like a "More".

References

English goldsmiths
16th-century English people
Chamberlains of the City of London
Material culture of royal courts